Barooj may refer to:
 Baruj, East Azerbaijan Province, Iran
 Barvaj, Qazvin Province, Iran